Ripi is a comune (municipality) in the Province of Frosinone in the Italian region Lazio, located about  southeast of Rome and about  east of Frosinone.

Ripi borders the following municipalities: Arnara, Boville Ernica, Ceprano, Pofi, Strangolagalli, Torrice, Veroli.

References

External links
 Official website

Cities and towns in Lazio